Captors is the debut studio album by Christian metal band Wolves at the Gate. The album was produced by Andreas Magnusson, and released on July 3, 2012 by Solid State Records. The album attracted both critical and commercial success.

Critical reception

Captors garnered praise from numerous music critics. At HM, Dan Garcia rated the album four out of five stars, stating that the release "stays consistent and on point without being experimental." Graeme Crawford of Cross Rhythms rated the album nine out of ten squares, writing that the release "is very, very good." At Jesus Freak Hideout, Wayne Myatt rated the album four-and-a-half stars, saying that the release "remains enjoyable from beginning to end." Brody B of Indie Vision Music rated the album a perfect five stars, stating that the release is "fantastic" because it combines "thoughtful lyrics, interesting music, and a sound unlike anything else [he's] [...] heard." At Christian Music Zine, Jake Lipman rated the album four-and-a-half stars out of five, writing that "Not only have they created lyrically one of the most intricate worshipful albums for a heavy band, they've also managed to up their musicianship a couple notches".

Candice Haridimou rated the album a 70-percent, saying that the music is "effortlessly bouncing between clean and unclean parts which when combined, add huge emotional punches into each track here." At Mind Equals Blown, Jarrod Church rated the album an eight out of ten, stating how the inclusion of just a single ballad would have been beneficial says that "there is not a single bad track on the album, every song scoring a par at the very least", which in his estimation "is always a stellar accomplishment." At Seattle Weekly, Joe Williams gave a positive review, writing that the release "grinds between unyielding and beautiful."

Track listing

Chart performance

Credits
WATG
 Nick Detty - harsh vocals
 Jeremy Steckel - lead guitar
 Steven Cobucci - rhythm guitar, clean vocals, additional production
 Ben Summers - bass, backing vocals
 Ben Millhouse - drums

Additional musicians
 Shane Blay (Oh, Sleeper, Wovenwar) - vocals
 Colin Jones - vocals

Production
 Brad Davis - design
 Brandon Ebel - executive producer
 Troy Glessner - mastering
 Andreas Magnusson - mixing, producer
 Adam Skatula - A&R
 Chad Weirick - management

References

2012 debut albums
Solid State Records albums
Wolves at the Gate (band) albums